Horticultural Hall (1845-1860s) of Boston, Massachusetts, stood at no.40 School Street. The Massachusetts Horticultural Society erected the building and used it as headquarters until 1860. Made of granite, it measured "86 feet in length and 33 feet in width ... [with] a large hall for exhibitions, a library and business room, and convenient compartments for the sale of seeds, fruits, plants and flowers." Among the tenants:  Journal of Agriculture; Azell Bowditch's seed store; and Morris Brothers, Pell & Trowbridge minstrels.

Events
1840s
 Benjamin Champney exhibit
 Exhibit of John Skirving's "Panorama of Fremont's Overland Journey to Oregon and California"
1850s
 "Living specimens ... of mankind" from Iximaya, Central America
 Harmoneons performance
 American Pomological Society meeting
 1854: Boston's first Women's Rights Convention

See also
 Horticultural Hall, Boston (1865)
 Horticultural Hall, Boston (1901)

References

External links

 Boston Athenaeum. Lithographs:
 Horticultural Hall. Boston : Published by Henry Prentiss; Printed by J.H. Bufford & Co.'s Lith., 1845.
 Horticultural Hall. Boston : Lane and Scott's Lithography, ca.1840s

Commercial buildings completed in 1845
Former buildings and structures in Boston
1845 establishments in Massachusetts
1860s disestablishments in Massachusetts
19th century in Boston